Ian Alexander may refer to:

 Ian Alexander (actor) (born 2001), American actor starring in The OA
 Ian Alexander (footballer) (born 1963), Scottish footballer
 Ian Alexander (politician) (born 1947), Australian politician
 Ian Alexander (aviation), Scottish entrepreneur associated with the Rigid Airship Design consortium

See also